Miss Shumway Goes West is a 1962 French-Argentine film.

See also
 Rough Magic (1995)

External links
 

1962 films
Argentine comedy-drama films
1960s Spanish-language films
French black-and-white films
Films based on works by James Hadley Chase
French comedy-drama films
1960s Argentine films
1960s French films